Harrison Spencer may refer to:

Harrison Spencer (dean) on List of London School of Hygiene & Tropical Medicine people
Harrison, Spencer, township in Indiana
Lt. Col. Harrison Spencer in 1919 Birthday Honours

See also
Harry Spencer (disambiguation)
Harrison Spence, baseball player and manager